Avelino Lopes is a municipality in the state of Piaui in the Northeast region of Brazil.
Rally is on the January at Sundays.

References

Municipalities in Piauí